MV Morocco Sun was a passenger vessel built for British Railways in 1979.

History

She was built in 1979 by Harland & Wolff, Belfast for IBOS Finance Ltd, and chartered by Sealink. She measured 12,175 Gross Register Tons, and fitted with two Pielstick 16PC2V diesel engines could achieve a speed of 19 knots. She could carry 1,000 passengers and 280 cars. She was employed on the Larne to Stranraer service from 1 May 1980.

In July 1984 she was registered to Sea Containers Ltd. 

In May 1990 she was sold to Stena Line and in February 1991 they renamed her Stena Galloway. 

Stena sold her in 2002 to the International Maritime Transport Corporation, Morocco and she was renamed Le Rif. There was an onboard fire on 22 April 2008 at Algeciras, Spain.

References

Notes

Bibliography

1979 ships
Passenger ships of the United Kingdom
Ships built by Harland and Wolff
Ships of British Rail